The Coey-Mitchell Automobile Company was an American automobile manufacturer that built the Coey automobiles and operated a chain of American Driving Schools from 1913 to 1917 and was headquartered in Chicago, Illinois. The company was founded under the name Coey-Mitchell Automobile Company by Charles A. Coey. The Coey family and their name come from Northern Ireland, where one still finds this name, for example in Comber.

The company introduced the two-cylinder Coey Junior and Coey Bear with four cylinders, two cycle cars. In addition, they made the four-or six-cylinder sports car Coey Flyer, which was built specifically for Coeys nationwide chain of driving schools. In 1917 Wonder Motor Truck Company bought the Coey Motor Company.

See also
List of defunct automobile manufacturers of the United States
List of automobile manufacturers of the United States
Brass Era car
History of the automobile
History of Chicago

References

Motor vehicle manufacturers based in Illinois
Defunct motor vehicle manufacturers of the United States
Cyclecars
Manufacturing companies based in Chicago
History of Chicago
Driver's education